James David McNitt (born 1948) is an American painter and photographer. He has worked as a news photographer for United Press International (1974), a freelance marine photojournalist (1975–1982), and as a contract photographer, writer and editor for Newsweek International Special Projects (1982–2002). Since 2002, McNitt has concentrated on digital printmaking and mixed-media paintings, especially images that advocate awareness of climate change and other environmental issues.

McNitt has contributed articles to Newsweek International, People and other periodicals and is the author of two books: “The Art of Computer Management,” and “The Home Video Sourcebook,”. He is also a member of the faculty at the Silvermine Guild Art Center in New Canaan, Connecticut, where he teaches digital imaging and printmaking.

References

“The Mouth of the South,” Time, (1977-08-08),  p. 42 (all photos by Jim McNitt)
“Cover,” Sail Magazine, (September 1978) (cover photo by Jim McNitt)
“Top Ten Marine Photographers of the 20th Century,” Motorboating & Sailing, (January 1980) p. 60 (photo by Jim McNitt)
McNitt, Jim. (1982), The Home Video Sourcebook, New York: Macmillan Publishers
McNitt, Jim.  “Photography in the Electronic Age,” Newsweek International, (1982-9-27), p. 29
“Cover," Yachting, (June 1983) (cover photo by Jim McNitt)
McNitt, Jim. “And We've Only Just Begun,” Newsweek, (1983-09-26), p. 57.
McNitt Jim. (1984), The Art of Computer Management, New York: Simon & Schuster
Avatar Review, Summer 2007
Orlov Fine-Art Gallery
Jim McNitt Home Page
Jim McNitt Bio
Artexpo NY 2009 Solo Artist Listing
Silvermine Guild Arts Center Faculty
Silvermine Guild Arts Center
Photo.net top photographers of all-time rankings

American photographers
20th-century American painters
American male painters
21st-century American painters
21st-century American male artists
1948 births
Living people
20th-century American male artists